Sandy Springs is an unincorporated community in Adams County, Ohio, United States, located at .

History
A post office called Sandy Springs was established in 1818. Sandy Springs once had its own school.

Notable people
Annie Turner Wittenmyer, Social reformer and relief worker

References

Unincorporated communities in Adams County, Ohio
1818 establishments in Ohio
Populated places established in 1818
Unincorporated communities in Ohio